John Papworth (12 December 1921 – 4 July 2020) was an English clergyman, writer and activist against big public and private organizations and for small communities and enterprises.

Life and work
Born in London in December 1921, Papworth was reared in an orphanage in Essex. After leaving it, he worked as a baker's boy and then a school chef until he joined the Home Guard during World War II; he served seven years as a military cook.

After the war, Papworth trained to be a vicar and became an ordained minister of the Church of England, serving in a number of parishes. In 1997 his comments about the morality of stealing from giant retail corporations resulted in international media attention and he was debarred from preaching. Then Home Secretary Michael Howard called the comments "shameful." Papworth said he was not encouraging theft, only saying he could comprehend it.

During the war he had joined the Communist Party, but objected to its authoritarianism and was ejected. He later joined the Labour Party and was its unsuccessful candidate for Salisbury at the 1955 general election. He also found that party too authoritarian, and developed an opposition to large state and mass organizations and a preference for the small community. He came to believe democracies dominated by remote party organizations could not meet people's needs or stop war.

In 1966 he joined like-minded thinkers E. F. Schumacher, Leopold Kohr and Sir Herbert Read and founded and edited Resurgence magazine. After leaving Resurgence, he founded Fourth World Review, a magazine which promoted "small nations, governed by small communities". From 1968 the publication sponsored several "Assemblies of the Fourth World"; these brought together people from around the world who envisioned creating a new society of small communities, small enterprises, and self-government in industry, public utilities, universities, etc. Papworth also stood for Parliament as a "Fourth World" candidate.

In the 1960s, he was imprisoned along with Bertrand Russell for anti-nuclear protests and was also imprisoned in the US during a black rights protest.  

Papworth was active as a peace campaigner and believed small societies were less likely to sacrifice their citizens in nuclear war or afford to pay for such weapons. In the 1970s and early 1980s, Papworth wrote regularly for the pacifist newspaper Peace News.

At age 75 in 1997, Papworth was quoted in the news media as advocating shoplifting by the "poor and hungry" from supermarkets ... "because Jesus said 'Love your neighbour' – he said nothing about loving Marks & Spencer". The Church subsequently barred him from preaching.

Also in 1997, Papworth admitted that he had helped to hide convicted spy and double-agent George Blake at his home in Earl's Court, London after his escape from prison in October 1966. Blake had been aided in his escape by "Ban the Bomb" campaigners, including Sean Bourke. He was not charged as a result of the incident.  

Papworth was the subject of two BBC documentaries entitled "No Man is an Island" and "Turbulent Priest".

In 2001, Papworth refused to return his census form, stating the government had no right to such information. He was fined £120.

A long-time resident of London, he later moved to Purton, Wiltshire. He edited a village magazine called "Purton Today" and was elected as a parish councillor. 

He died in July 2020 at the age of 98. His wife, Marcelle, had died in 1995.  

In his obituary, The Daily Telegraph described the "turbulent priest" as being, "at various times, a communist, cook, beggar, editor, presidential adviser, parliamentary candidate and prisoner".

Bibliography
 The Economics of Humanism
 New politics, Garlandfold, 1982; Small is powerful: the future as if people really mattered, Praeger, 1995
 Shut Up and Listen: A New Handbook for Revolutionaries, self-published, 1997
 Village democracy, Volume 25 of Societas (Imprint Academic), Societas Series, Ingram Publishing Services, 2006, 
 Co-editor with Ernst Friedrich Schumacher, A pair of cranks: a compendium of essays by two of the most influential and challenging authors of the 20th century (Selected essays by E.F. Schumacher and Leopold Kohr), New European, 2003, .

References

External links
 Portrait of John Papworth by Natalie d'Arbeloff
 New Internationalist article on John Papworth (1981)
 Fourth World Review, at Transition Network News web site.

1921 births
2020 deaths
Military personnel from London
British military personnel of World War II
British Home Guard soldiers
20th-century British military personnel
Green thinkers
British magazine editors
British male journalists
British political writers
People from Purton